D. Wayne Higby (born 12 May 1943, Colorado, USA) is an American artist working in ceramics.
The American Craft Museum considers him a "visionary of the American Crafts Movement" and recognized him as one of seven artists who are "genuine living legends representing the best of American artists in their chosen medium."

Biography
Born in Colorado Springs, Colorado, Higby received a B.F.A. from the University of Colorado at Boulder, in 1966, and an
M.F.A. from the University of Michigan, Ann Arbor, in 1968. Since 1973, he has been on the faculty of the New York State College of Ceramics at Alfred University, Alfred, NY.

Working both as a ceramic artist and an educator, Higby has earned international recognition since his one-person show at the American Craft Museum in 1973. His work focuses on "landscape imagery as a focal point of meditation", and ranges from the vessel form to tile and sculptural works. Rather than focusing on its functional aspects, Higby uses the vessel form as a vehicle for imagery, often inspired by the western landscapes of his childhood, that highlights the interplay between light, space, and time. 

"I strive to establish a zone of quiet coherence – a place full of silent, empty space where finite and infinite, intimate and immense intersect."

He is known for his inventive use of Raku earthenware, and an interest in porcelain following his experiences travelling and lecturing in China, where he has worked with artists to revitalize Chinese Ceramic art.  He is Honorary President and co-founder(with Jackson Li) of the Sanbao Ceramic Art Institute at Jingdezhen, and an Honorary Professor of Art at both the Jingdezhen Ceramic Institute and at Shanghai University, People’s Republic of China. 

He is also vice president of the International Academy of Ceramics in Geneva, Switzerland.

Academic appointments 
 New York State College of Ceramics at Alfred University, Alfred, NY, 1973–present
 Rhode Island School of Design, Providence, Rhode Island, 1970–73
 University of Nebraska at Omaha, 1968–1970

Awards 
 Distinguished Educator Award, James Renwick Alliance, 2002
 Honorary Professor of Art, College of Fine Arts, Shanghai University, 2000
 Recognition of Excellence, American Ceramic Society, 1998
 American Craft Movement Visionary Award, American Craft Museum, 1995
 College of Fellows, American Craft Council, 1995
 Honorary Professor of Ceramic Art, Jingdezhen Ceramic Institute, P.R. of China, 1995
 Chancellor’s Award for Excellence in Teaching, State University of New York, 1993
 Master Teacher Award, University of Hartford, Hartford, CT, 1990
 George A. and Eliza Howard Foundation Fellowship, 1986
 New York Foundation for the Arts Fellowship, 1985, 1989
 National Endowment for the Arts Fellowship, 1973, 1977, 1988

Solo exhibitions 
 Wayne Higby: Landscape as Memory, 1990–1999, Museum of Art & Design, Helsinki, Finland, 1999
 Morgan Gallery, Kansas City, MO, 1991, 1997
 Hartford Art School, University of Hartford, CT, 1990
 Helen Drutt Gallery, New York, NY, 1988, 1990
 Greenwich House Pottery, New York, NY, 1984
 Okun-Thomas Gallery, St. Louis, MO, 1979
 Helen Drutt Gallery, Philadelphia, PA, 1976, 1978, 1979, 1980, 1982, 1996
 Exhibit A, Gallery of American Ceramics, Evanston, IL, 1975, 1978, 1980
 Museum of Contemporary Crafts (American Craft Museum), New York, NY, 1973
 Benson Gallery, Bridgehampton, Long Island, NY, 1971
 Archie Bray Foundation, Helena, MT, 1970
 Joslyn Art Museum, Omaha, NE, 1969

Work in public collections 
 American Craft Museum (now The Museum of Arts & Design), New York City, NY, USA
 Brooklyn Museum of Art, New York City, NY, USA
 Carnegie Institute, Museum of Art, Pittsburgh, PA, USA
 Honolulu Museum of Art, Honolulu, HI, USA
 Denver Art Museum, Denver, CO, USA
 Everson Museum of Art, Syracuse, NY, USA
Fine Arts Museums of San Francisco, San Francisco, CA, USA
 Jingdezhen Museum of Art, P.R. China
 Los Angeles County Museum of Art, Los Angeles, CA, USA
 Metropolitan Museum of Art, New York City, NY, USA
 Minneapolis Institute of Arts, Minneapolis, MN, USA
 Museum for Contemporary art Het Kruithuis, 's-Hertogenbosch, The Netherlands
Museum of Fine Arts, Boston, Boston, Massachusetts, USA
Museum of Fine Arts, Houston, Houston, TX, USA
 National Museum of Modern Art, Tokyo, Japan
 Renwick Gallery, Smithsonian American Art Museum, Washington, DC, USA
 Philadelphia Museum of Art, Philadelphia, PA, USA
 Schein-Joseph International Museum of Ceramic Art, Alfred, NY, USA
Smithsonian American Art Museum, Washington, DC, USA
University of Michigan Museum of Art, Ann Arbor, MI, USA
 Victoria and Albert Museum, London, UK

Notes

References

External links 
 Faculty profile at Alfred University

1943 births
Living people
Artists from Colorado Springs, Colorado
American ceramists
University of Colorado alumni
University of Michigan alumni
Alfred University faculty
Artists from Colorado